Novosyolka is a rural locality (a selo) in Deniskinsky Selsoviet, Fyodorovsky District, Bashkortostan, Russia. The population was 558 as of 2010. There are 8 streets.

Geography 
Novosyolka is located 26 km south of Fyodorovka (the district's administrative centre) by road. Kiryushkino is the nearest rural locality.

References 

Rural localities in Fyodorovsky District